Coleophora ferruginea is a moth of the family Coleophoridae. It is found in Turkey.

References

ferruginea
Endemic fauna of Turkey
Moths described in 1994
Moths of Asia